The United Kingdom is committed to legally binding greenhouse gas emissions reduction targets of 34% by 2020 and 80% by 2050, compared to 1990 levels, as set out in the Climate Change Act 2008. Decarbonisation of electricity generation will form a major part of this reduction and is essential before other sectors of the economy can be successfully decarbonised.

The Government’s proposals for electricity market reform, published in a White Paper in July 2011, included three initiatives to encourage decarbonisation of electricity generation in the UK: A Carbon Price Floor to complement the European Union Emissions Trading Scheme (EU ETS); Feed-in tariffs which will eventually replace the Renewables Obligation; and an Emissions Performance Standard to restrict future use of the most carbon-intensive forms of generation.

In implementing these proposals, the Government aims to attract investment in low-carbon generation, deliver security of supply through an appropriate mix of electricity sources and ensure a minimum amount of impact on consumer bills; all this at a time when security of supply is threatened by scheduled closures of existing plants and both the demand for, and subsequently the price of, electricity is increasing.

Proposals for decarbonisation 
The Government published Planning Our Electric Future: A White Paper for Secure, Affordable and Low-Carbon Electricity in July 2011. The paper contained three proposals designed to encourage decarbonisation of the UK electricity sector, the rationale behind the introduction and potential impacts of a Carbon Price Floor, Feed-in tariffs and an Emissions Performance Standard are discussed in turn below.

Carbon price floor
The European Union Emissions Trading Scheme (EU ETS) is a cap and trade system covering the European electricity generation sector and energy intensive industries. Introduced in 2005, it provides a mechanism through which the European price of carbon can be gradually increased to take into account negative externalities, such as the social and environmental impact of emissions, which would not normally be considered.

The inability of the market to reflect the full cost of carbon is known as a market failure. The importance of accounting for the full cost of carbon in investment decisions was highlighted by the influential Stern Review of the Economics of Climate Change which found that the cost of taking action to reduce emissions now is much less than the cost to the economy if no action is taken and adaptation is required at a later date.

The EU ETS operates by setting an overall cap on emissions and allocating tradable permits to participants in the scheme. If a participant wishes to emit more than their allocation they must purchase additional permits from a participant who does not require their full allocation. The price of carbon is escalated slowly by reducing the amount of credits in circulation, gradually increasing the incentive for businesses to seek low-carbon alternatives.

Rather than forcing all participants to reduce emissions by a set amount, cap and trade systems allow individual organisations to respond in the most effective way, whether by reducing emissions or buying extra permits, thereby reducing the overall cost of achieving emissions reductions.

In practice however, whilst providing certainty over the pace and scale of EU emissions reductions, the EU ETS has failed to raise the price of carbon sufficiently to steer behaviour away from carbon-intensive practices. This failure can be attributed to the presence of a surplus amount of credits in the system, both due to the application of the principle of precedent, whereby free permits were allocated to actors whose business is completely dependent on producing emissions, and a lack of data on actual emissions when the original cap was set.

The failures identified are not failures of the cap and trade system itself, rather failures in its implementation. Emissions trading remains the Government’s preferred option for reducing emissions, an approach also supported by the Stern Review. Steps can be taken to improve the effectiveness of the EU ETS, in fact, the presence of surplus credits would start to be addressed from 2013, after which the cap will be tightened each year and the number of credits in the system reduced. However, given that the initial cap appears to have been set too high, the carbon price may remain low, and subject to volatility, for some time after this date until the cap is tightened sufficiently.

Due in part to failures in the implementation of the EU ETS and a discrepancy between EU and UK emissions reduction targets, the EU scheme is not consistent with the pace and scale of change required to meet UK decarbonisation targets. As such, the carbon price set by the EU ETS has not been certain or high enough to encourage sufficient investment in low-carbon electricity generation in the UK.  The UK Government has therefore identified that additional incentives are required to ensure that progress towards meeting the UK emissions reduction targets continues to be made. Furthermore the measures should be coherent with the EU ETS so that the UK can continue operating within the scheme until an additional incentive is no longer required.  The introduction of the Carbon Price Floor is intended to achieve these aims.

Setting a Carbon Price Floor will prevent the price of carbon in the UK falling below a target level by topping up the carbon price set by the EU ETS when necessary. The target level chosen by the Government must be high enough to provide a strong signal to investors that low-carbon electricity generation represents a secure, long-term investment. A secondary aim is to encourage a change in dispatch decisions for existing generation, favouring the use of less carbon-intensive generation over more traditional forms when both are available. The carbon price floor is intended to provide greater certainty on future carbon prices, protecting investors in UK low-carbon initiatives from the volatility of the EU carbon price. This has the effect of reducing the amount of risk that investors are exposed to and decreasing the cost of capital for low-carbon investment.

In setting the Carbon Floor Price, the Government must achieve a balance between encouraging investments in low-carbon generation without unfairly impacting existing generators, undermining the competitiveness of UK industry or increasing electricity prices unduly. For these reasons, the introduction of a Carbon Floor Price is insufficient on its own to deliver sufficient investment and is supplemented by a proposed change in the support mechanism for low-carbon generation to a form of Feed-in tariff, discussed below.

Feed-in tariff 
A Feed-in tariff (FIT) provides a fixed level of income for a low-carbon generator over a specified period of time. There are three main types: a Premium FIT offers a static payment in addition to the revenue gained by selling electricity on the market; a Fixed FIT provides a static payment designed to replace any revenue from selling in the electricity market; and a FIT with a contract for difference (CfD), where a variable payment is made to ensure that the generator receives the agreed tariff assuming they sell their electricity at market price.

A FIT with CfD is the Government’s preferred choice as it is deemed to be the most cost-effective whilst retaining an appropriate amount of exposure to market forces. The requirement to sell electricity on the market encourages operators to make efficient decisions about dispatch and maintenance given that revenues above the agreed tariff can be achieved if electricity is sold at above the average market price. Contact with the market would be completely removed under a Fixed FIT, potentially leading to sub-optimal operational decisions, and too great under a Premium FIT, over-exposing operators to future electricity price uncertainty.

It is proposed that Feed-in tariffs with Contracts for Difference (FIT CfD) will replace the current support mechanism, the Renewables Obligation (RO), in 2017 after running in parallel from 2013. The Renewables Obligation encourages the generation of electricity from renewable energy sources by awarding Renewable Obligation Certificates (ROCs) to generators. Renewables Obligation Certificates provide an additional source of income in that they can be sold to suppliers who are obligated to source an increasing amount of the electricity they provide from renewable energy sources.

The Renewables Obligation has been successful in encouraging the development of well established forms of renewable energy such as landfill gas and onshore wind but has been less successful in bringing through less well developed technologies to market competitiveness. Modelling of future deployment scenarios indicates that a significant contribution would be required from less mature technologies which lacked sufficient incentive to develop into feasible alternatives under the original Renewables Obligation scheme. The Renewables Obligation also does not apply to nuclear generation.

Further criticism of the Renewables Obligation in its original form included uncertainty over the price of a Renewables Obligation Certificate, which varies depending on demand and could reduce significantly if the amount of electricity produced from renewable energy sources approaches the obligation level. The presence of this risk acted as a perverse incentive for the market not to meet the obligation.

The Renewables Obligation has also been criticised for acting as a barrier to entry for small generators, with only large companies able to overcome the high transaction costs and high investment risks associated with the mechanism. Any reduction in risk would improve access to capital markets which is especially important for small companies who can’t finance projects from their balance sheet alone.

Reforms of the Renewables Obligation since its introduction in 2002 have aimed to address these issues. The introduction of banding in 2009 allowed the incentives for renewable energy technologies that are further from market to be increased whilst the amount of support for well established technologies could be reduced to avoid over-subsidisation. The introduction of guaranteed headroom, also in 2009, eliminated the risk of a significant drop in ROC prices by setting the obligation level to ensure that there is always sufficient demand for ROCs. Feed-in tariffs were introduced in 2010 as an alternative to the Renewables Obligation for projects of less than 5MW with the aim of simplifying the process and removing barriers to access for smaller generators. The Renewables Obligation scheme was also extended to alleviate concerns over the finite and limited duration of subsidies.

Mitigating some of the risks associated with the support mechanism is an alternative to raising the level of support. Despite the reforms to the Renewables Obligation detailed above, some risks, such as uncertainty over future electricity prices, remained. The introduction of a feed-in tariff to support all low-carbon generation successfully addresses this risk, which should translate into a reduced cost of capital. The introduction of a feed-in tariff is therefore intended to reduce the cost of delivering low-carbon electricity supply. Feed-in tariffs may not be as efficient in the short term but provide long term stability, incentives and resources for efficiency savings allowing tariffs to be reduced in the future.

Policy uncertainty can be created due to excessive change in the support mechanism. The Government has taken steps to mitigate this risk by publishing timetables and consulting with industry on the scale and pace of reforms, conducting an impact assessment, overlapping the introduction of feed-in tariffs with the Renewables Obligation for a period of four years and pledging to continue providing support for existing schemes under the Renewables Obligation. Despite these measures, the introduction of a new incentive scheme runs the risk of triggering a hiatus in investment if investors are unsure about how the scheme will work or uncertain whether it represents a good investment.

In addition to reforming the support mechanism, the Government is simultaneously taking steps to address other barriers to deployment, such as delays caused by the planning system and availability of grid connections. The Renewable Energy Roadmap, published by the Government in 2011, identifies the main barriers to deployment and potential deployment levels for each form of renewable energy and details how these barriers will be overcome.

Emissions performance standard
The decarbonisation incentives provided by the Carbon Price Floor and Feed-In Tariffs are further supplemented by the proposed introduction of an Emissions Performance Standard (EPS) to limit the amount of carbon dioxide that new power stations can emit per kWh of electricity generated. An Emissions Performance Standard is deemed to be required in the event that the market incentives detailed above are not sufficient in themselves to steer the electricity sector away from the most carbon intensive forms of generation.

The level at which the EPS is set recognises that fossil fuel generation currently still has an important role to play in ensuring security of supply, providing stable base-load and flexibility, whilst at the same time retaining consistency with decarbonisation objectives by preventing the construction of new coal-fired power stations without carbon capture and storage technology and maintaining affordable electricity prices.

The proposed EPS only applies to electricity generation, and is set at a level to balance the delivery of decarbonisation targets against the cost of electricity. Using the argument that decarbonising electricity is key to decarbonising UK energy supplies, many commentators have criticised H.M.Government for not introducing a far more onerous 2030 electricity EPS. This argument is based on the incorrect assumption that gas cannot be decarbonised economically at large scale.

Typically methane synthesis produces around 55% CO2 and 45% CH4. Separating these gases into two streams in order to inject Synthetic Natural Gas (SNG) into the gas grid leaves high purity, high pressure CO2 as a waste by-product readily available for use for CCS at near zero marginal cost of capture and compression. If 45% biogenic:55%fossil mixed fuel is used to produce SNG with CCS, zero net CO2 emissions are produced. This concept is called Low Carbon Gas (LCG). In USA, it is called Carbon Neutral SNG. The typical marginal abatement cost of carbon for LCG making is around 40 to 50p/tonne supercritical CO2.

Gas is a storable primary energy resource, whereas electricity is an instantaneous secondary energy vector. Energy flows from the gas grid, but vice versa. 250 times more energy is stored as gas in UK than as electricity. The capital cost of gas transmission is 1/15th the cost per MWkm of electricity transmission. 5 times more energy flows through the gas grid than the electricity grid at the Winter demand peak.

Gas is typically 1/3rd the cost per unit energy of electricity. Carbon negative gas can be produced from mixed wastes, biomass and coal at large scale at a cost of around 45 to 50 p/therm, 1/6th DECC and OFGEM's projected 2030 cost per unit energy of decarbonised electricity of £100/MWh.

The technology to produce large quantities of low cost Synthetic Natural Gas (SNG) was developed jointly between HM Ministry of Fuel and Power and British Gas Corporation between 1955 and 1992, with a view to supplying the whole of UK gas demand post-2010 when it was foreseen that North Sea gas would run out. Key elements of British Gas SNG technology are currently in use at the World's largest and longest-running SNG plant with Carbon Capture and Sequestration (CCS) at Great Plains in Dakota, and are being developed at industrial scale in China under the current 2010 to 2015 Five Year Plan.

A simple modification to the British Gas SNG technology will enable carbon negative SNG to be produces at 60 bar pressure, and high purity supercritical CO2 to be produced at 150 bar pressure, at near zero net loss of energy efficiency, or additional cost. Carbon negative SNG can be used to generate carbon negative electricity at lower cost than incumbent fossil gas or electricity. Given that electricity and gas can both be decarbonised with equal facility, and at nearly equal low costs, there is no need to introduce an onerous EPS with a view to largely 'squeezing' gas fired electricity generation off the grid by 2030. Instead it is proposed that technology neutral equal renewables and decarbonisation targets are introduced for both low carbon gas and electricity, with Contracts for Differences for both low carbon gas and low carbon electricity, the relative 'strike prices' to be set by reference to the historic gas to electricity price ratio. This will spread cost-effective decarbonisation equally over both the gas and electricity grids, and their associated infrastructure.

The final enacted version of The Energy Act 2013 included a late amendment: Schedule 4 to Section 57 of the Act. Schedule 4 enables any gasification plant, CCS plant, and any two or more associated power plants, or any part thereof, to be considered as a single system for the determination of net anthropogenic CO2 emissions, and low carbon electricity generation. The Schedule is silent about what fuel may be used for gasification; how the gasification and CCS plants operate or are inter-connected, and what type of gaseous energy vector flows from the gasification and CCS plants to the two or more power plants, or any part thereof. Typically, gaseous energy vectors used for power generation are: synthesis gas (aka Syngas or town gas - a mixture of CO, CO2, H2 and CH4); Hydrogen (H2), or methane (aka natural gas, synthetic natural gas or biomethane - CH4).

Any of the above gas vectors could comply with the terms of Schedule 4. In reality, the only gas transmission network in the UK connecting two or more power plants is the existing UK gas grid. Provided, therefore, that methane injected into the grid has had its anthropogenic carbon emissions offset at source by the use of either biogenic fuels, CCS or a combination of both, such methane will comply with the terms of The Energy Act, and generators burning such gas to produce low carbon electricity will be eligible for support by Contracts for Differences. DECC has confirmed that such a scheme is eligible for support by CfD.

As carbon offset methane injected into the high pressure gas transmission grid will be distributed equally to all gas end users: transport, heat, industry and power generators, enhanced revenue earned by CfD supported gas fired power stations can be used to underwrite the decarbonizing of the gas grid.

Summary 
In combination, the introduction of a Carbon Price Floor and Feed-In Tariffs would act as two clear economic signals to the market with the aim of encouraging a market response to the challenge of decarbonising the UK electricity generation sector. The Emissions Performance Standard is a regulatory backup designed to complement the incentives for low-carbon generation by preventing further construction of the most carbon-intensive forms of generation.

As the need for action to meet the UK’s emissions reduction targets has become more urgent the Government has provided an increased level of steering through both market-based incentives and regulation. The Government has intervened to ensure that market signals provided by the carbon price and incentives for low-carbon generation are strong enough to encourage sufficient investment in decarbonisation.

The Government has been reluctant to intervene in the past, preferring instead to defer to market forces, but, as illustrated by the evolution of the Renewables Obligation, the Government has found it increasingly necessary to perform a more strategic role. The requirement for Government intervention does not necessarily mean that markets are unable to deliver the required changes, indeed, market mechanisms remain the preferred option for decarbonising UK electricity supply, just that they must be designed and implemented in such a way that delivers the scale and pace of change required.

There is no plan to revert to pre-privatisation ‘Command and Control’ type policy. Instead policy frameworks, market design and regulation are the tools by which the Government seeks to drive investment in energy projects which are considered to be compatible with policy objectives. In other words, the market still decides, but the Government designs the market framework in a way that influences the decision.

See also
Electricity sector in the United Kingdom
Climate change in the United Kingdom
UK enterprise law
Campaign to Electrify Britain’s Railways

References

Climate change policy in the United Kingdom
Electric power in the United Kingdom